The Round Barn, Cooper Township is a historic building located in Cooper Township southwest of Mapleton in rural Monona County, Iowa, United States. It was built in 1921 by Seth Smith. An auctioneer had this barn built to sell his purebred cattle. The building is a true round barn that measures  in diameter. The barn features white vertical siding, a conical roof, and an aerator. It has been listed on the National Register of Historic Places since 1986.

References

 

Buildings and structures completed in 1921
Buildings and structures in Monona County, Iowa
Barns on the National Register of Historic Places in Iowa
Round barns in Iowa
National Register of Historic Places in Monona County, Iowa